Gamal Amin Abdel Ghani (born 20 April 1963) is an Egyptian field hockey player. He competed in the 1992 Summer Olympics.

References

External links
 

1963 births
Living people
Field hockey players at the 1992 Summer Olympics
Egyptian male field hockey players
Olympic field hockey players of Egypt